Calle Lindh (born 10 March 1990) is a Swedish alpine ski racer.

He competed at the 2015 World Championships in Beaver Creek, USA, in the giant slalom race, in which he crashed out of the second run.

References

1990 births
Swedish male alpine skiers
Universiade medalists in alpine skiing
Living people
Place of birth missing (living people)
Universiade silver medalists for Sweden
Universiade bronze medalists for Sweden
Medalists at the 2011 Winter Universiade
21st-century Swedish people